Mont-l'Étroit is a commune in the Meurthe-et-Moselle department in North-Eastern France.

See also
Communes of the Meurthe-et-Moselle department

References

Montletroit